The fourth round of AFC matches for the 2022 FIFA World Cup qualification consisted of a single match that determined the AFC representative in the intercontinental play-offs against the CONMEBOL representative. This round was originally scheduled as a two-legged tie for 11 and 16 November 2021, but the dates and format were changed in November 2020 in response to impacts from the COVID-19 pandemic in Asia.

The match featured the United Arab Emirates and Australia. It was played at Ahmad bin Ali Stadium in Al Rayyan, Qatar, on 7 June 2022.

Background
Since the 1998 FIFA World Cup qualification the last round of the Asian qualifiers (in this case, the fourth round) has consisted of a matchup between two teams coming from a previous round, and the winning team would represent AFC in the intercontinental play-offs (except the 1998 campaign, in which the play-off winners qualified directly for the FIFA World Cup, while the losers advanced to the intercontinental play-offs).

The United Arab Emirates had previously played once at this stage, they faced Iran in the 2002 play-off and lost 0–4 on aggregate. Australia had also previously played at this stage once, it was the 2018 edition where they defeated Syria 3–2 on aggregate.

This was the third match between the United Arab Emirates and Australia in the Asian World Cup qualifying, with the previous two being Australian victories (both in the 2018 qualifiers).

Format
In the fourth round, the two third-placed teams from the third round competed in a single-match play-off. Since the fourth round format was changed from two-legged tie to a single-match at a neutral venue, the game was played under the single-leg play-off rules from the preliminary competition, with extra time of two periods of 15 minutes would be played if the match was tied after the regular time of 90 minutes, followed by a penalty shoot-out to decide the winner if the match still tied after extra time (Regulations Article 20.11).

The winner advanced to the intercontinental play-offs six days later, also in Qatar.

Qualified teams

The United Arab Emirates qualified for the fourth round after finishing third of Group A in the third round. Previously, they had won their group in the second round, winning six and losing two of their eight matches, leaving Vietnam (by only 1 point), Malaysia, Thailand and Indonesia behind. In the third round, the UAE were part of Group A, alongside Iran, South Korea, Iraq, Syria and Lebanon. They finished third with 12 points and a record of 3 wins, 3 draws and 4 losses, behind Iran and South Korea who qualified directly for the final tournament.

Australia also qualified by finishing third in the third round (Group B). Previously, they had won their group in the second round, winning all eight of their matches and taking a 10-point lead over Kuwait and Jordan in second and third place respectively, with Nepal and Chinese Taipei far behind. In the third round, Australia were part of Group B, alongside Saudi Arabia, Japan, Oman, China PR and Vietnam. They finished third with 15 points and a record of 4 wins, 3 draws and 3 losses, behind Saudi Arabia and Japan who qualified directly for the final tournament.

The United Arab Emirates started the qualification process with Dutchman Bert van Marwijk. However, he was sacked on 12 February 2022 after the team ran out of direct qualification options as Iran and South Korea had secured the first two places of Group A in the third round. Argentine Rodolfo Arruabarrena was announced as the UAE's new coach one day later, while Australia kept Graham Arnold as their coach throughout the process.

Match

Goalscorers

Notes

References

External links

Qualifiers – Asia Matches: Round 4, FIFA.com
FIFA World Cup, the-AFC.com
FIFA World Cup 2022, stats.the-AFC.com

4
2022 in Asian football
Australia national soccer team matches
United Arab Emirates national football team matches
FIFA World Cup qualification, AFC Round 4
International association football competitions hosted by Qatar
Sport in Al Rayyan
Association football events postponed due to the COVID-19 pandemic
Australia at the 2022 FIFA World Cup